Ramakistapuram Gate railway station (station code: RKO) is a railway station in Hyderabad, Telangana, India near  Ramakrishnapuram Lake, Neredmet, from which localities like R K Puram, Trimulgherry, Sainikpuri, AS Rao Nagar and Kapra are accessible.

Ramakistapuram is the anglicised name for Ramakrishnapuram.

R K Puram Bridge 
Flyover over the railway line at RK Puram was constructed by the GHMC. Areas at the eastern end of the flyover are under GHMC jurisdiction, while those on its western end are under the jurisdiction of the Secunderabad Cantonment Board (SCB) and the Local Military Authority. 

Greater Hyderabad Municipal Corporation (GHMC) has proposed to construct a two-lane railway overbridge (ROB) parallel to the existing ROB at the RK Puram railway gate.

Lines
Hyderabad Multi-Modal Transport System
Secunderabad–Bolarum route (BS Line)

References

External links
MMTS Timings as per South Central Railway

MMTS stations in Hyderabad
Hyderabad railway division